The 1984 US Indoors was a women's tennis tournament played on indoor carpet courts at the Four Seasons Racquet Club in Livingston, New Jersey in the  United States that was part of the 1984 Virginia Slims World Championship Series. The tournament was held from February 20 through February 26, 1984. First-seeded Martina Navratilova won the singles title.

Finals

Singles
 Martina Navratilova defeated  Chris Evert 6–2, 7–6
 It was Navratilova's 3rd title of the year and the 182nd of her career.

Doubles
 Martina Navratilova /  Pam Shriver defeated  Jo Durie /  Ann Kiyomura 5–7, 6–3, 6–3
 It was Navratilova's 2nd title of the year and the 181st of her career. It was Shriver's 3rd title of the year and the 46th of her career.

External links
 ITF tournament edition details

US Indoors
US Indoor Championships
Livingston, New Jersey
1984 in American tennis